The Swiss Federal Institute for Forest, Snow and Landscape Research (WSL, German: Eidgenössische Forschungsanstalt für Wald, Schnee und Landschaft, French: Institut fédéral de recherches sur la forêt, la neige et le paysage) is a Swiss research institution, part of the Swiss Federal Institutes of Technology Domain.

Its scope of research includes "...changes to the terrestrial environment, and the use and protection of natural habitats and cultural landscapes."

It is headquartered in Birmensdorf, Zürich and maintains a large office in Davos, home of the WSL's Institute for Snow and Avalanche Research (SLF). The SLF is responsible for producing a national avalanche bulletin twice daily during winter.

From 1942 until 2019, the WSL owned and operated a research institute on the Weissfluhjoch mountain (2693 meters, 8835 ft) above Davos. It was mostly used to study avalanches.

See also 
 Science and technology in Switzerland
 Federal Office of Meteorology and Climatology

Notes and references

External links 
 

Research institutes in Switzerland
ETH Domain
Laboratories in Switzerland